The 1965 Memphis State Tigers football team represented Memphis State College (now known as the University of Memphis) as an independent during the 1965 NCAA University Division football season. In its eighth season under head coach Billy J. Murphy, the team compiled a 5–5 record and outscored opponents by a total of 215 to 153. Don McClard, Billy Fletcher, and Harry Day were the team captains. The team played its home games at Memphis Memorial Stadium in Memphis, Tennessee. 

The team's statistical leaders included Billy Fletcher with 1,239 passing yards and 556 rushing yards and Bob Sherlag with 673 receiving yards and 54 points scored.

Schedule

References

Memphis State
Memphis Tigers football seasons
Memphis State Tigers football